The following is a list of sites in Jinan. It contains sites of natural, cultural, economic, political, or historical significance in the City of Jinan, Shandong, China. The geographical area covered by this list includes  all counties and districts that are under the administration of Jinan City.

Springs

The most renowned springs in Jinan are included in the list of the "seventy-two famous springs".  This list has been kept and updated since the times of the Jin, Ming, and Qing dynasties. The following sites are on the current list of the 72 famous springs:

Baotu Spring (also "Jet Spring" or "Spurting Spring", west of the city center)
Jinxian Spring (in Baotu Spring Park)
Huanghua Spring (in Baotu Spring Park)
Liuxu Spring (in Baotu Spring Park)
Woniu Spring (literally "lying cattle spring", in Baotu Spring Park)
Shuyu Spring (in Baotu Spring Park)
Mapao Spring (in Baotu Spring Park)
Wuyou Spring (literally "carefree spring", in Baotu Spring Park)
Shiwan Spring (in Baotu Spring Park)
Zhanlu Spring (in Baotu Spring Park)
Manjing Spring (in Baotu Spring Park)
Dengzhou Spring (in Baotu Spring Park)
Dukang Spring (in Baotu Spring Park)
Wangshui Spring (in Baotu Spring Park)
Pearl Spring (namesake of a spring group, in the city center)
Sanshui Spring (in Pearl Spring group)
Brook Pavilion Spring (in Pearl Spring group)
Chu Spring (in Pearl Spring group)
Zhuoying Spring (also known as the Palace Pool)
Jade Ring Spring (on Shengfuqian Street, in the historical city center)
Water Lily Spring (address: No. 69 Water Lily Street, in the historical city center)
Shunjing Spring (on Shunjing Street)
Flying Dragon Spring (at northern end of Wangfu Chizi Road)
Double Loyalty Spring (on Shuangzhongci Street)
Black Tiger Spring (on the south moat)
Pipa Spring (next to the southern moat in Huancheng Park)
Manao Spring (south of Liberation Pavilion in Huancheng Park)
Hundred Rocks Spring (at the foot of Liberation Pavilion in Huancheng Park)
Nine Women Spring (at the foot of the Liberation Pavilion in Huancheng Park)
Five Dragon Pool (namesake of a spring group, west of the city center)
Gu Wen Spring (in the Five Dragon Pool spring group)
Xianqing Spring (in the Five Dragon Pool spring group)
Tianjing Spring (in the Five Dragon Pool spring group)
Yueya Spring (in the Five Dragon Pool spring group)
Ximizhi Spring (in the Five Dragon Pool spring group)
Guanjiachi Spring (in the Five Dragon Pool spring group)
Huima Spring (in the Five Dragon Pool spring group)
Qiuxi Spring (in the Five Dragon Pool spring group)
Jade Spring (in the Five Dragon Pool spring group)
Lian Spring (in the Five Dragon Pool spring group)
Hua Spring (on the foot of Hua Hill,)
Jiangshui Spring (in Jiangshui Spring Village)
Inkstone Spring (at the foot of Yanchi Mountain, Yaojia County)
Ganlu Spring (on the site of the Kaiyuan Temple, Fohui Mountain)
Linji Spring (in the Dragon Cave area)
Doumu Spring (in Doumuquan Village)
Wuying Pool (literally "Shadeless Pool", Wuyingshan Road, Tianqiao District)
Bai Spring (in Zhifang Village, Wangsheren County)
Yong Spring (in Liubu National Forest Park)
Kuju Spring (in Yuanhong Valley, Liubu County)
Summer Vacation Spring (in Yuanhong Valley, Liubu County)
Tu Spring (in Tu Spring Village, Liubu County)
Niyu Spring (in Niyu Spring Village, Liubu County)
Great Spring (in Jinxiuchuan Village)
Sacred Water Spring (in the Red Leaves Valley)
Duanhua Spring (in the "Jiuding Pagoda Park of Minority Customs")
Jade River Spring (formerly "Yuke Spring", in Yuhequan Village, Licheng District)
Baimai Spring (namesake of a spring group)
East Mawan Spring (in Baimai Springs Park)
West Mawan Spring (on Huiquan Road, Zhangqiu City)
Mo Spring (in Baimai Springs Park)
Plum Blossom Spring (in Baimai Springs Park)
Jingming Spring (also called Mingshui Spring, in Zhangqiu City)
Cassock Spring (also called Dugu Spring, at the Lingyan Temple)
Zhuoxi Spring (at the Lingyan Temple)
Qingling Spring (on Wufeng Mountain)
Tanbao Spring (at the Lingyan Temple)
Xiaolu Spring (in Changqing District)
Hongfan Pond  (namesake of a spring group, in Pingyin County)
Academy Spring (also called "Dongliu Spring", Hongfan Pond Village, Pingyin County)
Hu Spring (below th north cliff of Cuishan Mountain, Pingyin County)
Livelihood Spring (on Yuncui Mountain, Pingyin County)

Not included in the "Seventy-two famous springs":
Five Lotus Spring (on the south moat)

Hills

Bao Hill
Five Peaks Mountain
Heroes Hill
Thousand Buddha Mountain
Qinglong Hill

Nine Solitary Hills
The "Nine Solitary Hills" are a group of small solitary hills in the Yellow River valley within and to the north of Jinan City known for their scenic beauty:
Hua Hill (literally "Flower Hill")

Woniu Hill (literally "Lying Cow Hill")
Que Hill (literally "Magpie Hill")
Biao Hill ("Landmark Hill")
Fenghuang Hill (Fenghuang is the "Chinese Phoenix")
Northern Maan Hill (literally "Northern Horseshoe Hill")
Su Hill (literally "Grain Hill",)
Kuang Hill (literally "Basket Hill")
Yao Hill (literally "Medicine Hill")

Rivers, Streams, and Lakes

Yellow River
Daming Lake
White Cloud Lake (in Zhangqiu City)
Xiaoqing River
Luo River
Hundred Flower Pond
Jinan East Lake

Parks and Nature Reserves

Huang Tai Park )
Jinan Baihua Park
Jinan Botanical Garden
Jinan Zoo
Jinan Hundred Miles Yellow River Scenic Area
Three Officials Temple Scenic Area
Yellow River Forest Park
Red Leaves Valley
Coiling Dragon Hill Forest Park
Yaoxiang National Forest Park
Waterscreen Canyon Scenic Area
Jinan Tang King Pingyuan Forest Park
Zhufeng Hill Scenic Area

Museums and Libraries

Shandong Provincial Museum
Jinan Municipal Museum (address: Jing Shiyi Road No. 30)
Shandong Science and Technology Museum
Shandong Provincial Library
Jinan Municipal Library
Guangzhi Yuan (Old Museum,)
Zhangqiu Municipal Museum (address: Zhao-Qing Road No. 135, Zhangqiu City)
Memorial Hall for the Battle of Jinan

Archaeological Sites

Chengziya Archaeological Site ("Chengziya Ruins Museum")
Daxinzhuang Shang Period Archaeological Site (in Wangsheren Town , Licheng District, to the northeast of the city center of Jinan)
Luozhuang Han Tomb
Shuangshan Han Tomb
Weishan Han Tomb (south of Shèngjǐng	Zhèn, Zhangqiu City)
Tomb of the Jibei King

Religious Sites

Fuxue Confucian Temple
Chenjialou Saint Joseph Church (built in 1909, address: Qian Chenjialou 63)
Dragon Cave
Xiaotang Mountain Han Shrine (literally "Xiaotang Mountain Guo Family Tomb Stone Ancestral Hall")
Great Southern Mosque
Great Northern Mosque
Dahuaishu Mosque (address: North Dahuaishu Street, Huaiyin District)
Nanguan Mosque (address: Zhengjue Temple Street)
Liuxing Mosque (address: Liuxing East Street, Shizhong District)
Dikou Mosque (address: Cuijiadikou, Dikou Village)
Luokou Mosque (address: Tianqiao District)
Xiaozhai Village Mosque
Guandi Temple (Water Lily Street)
Guandi Temple (Communist Youth League Street)
Kaiyuan Temple Ruins
Lingyan Temple
Sacred Heart Cathedral
Huzhuang Church
Shentong Temple Ruins
Three Emperor Temple Ruins
Great Buddha Head
Four Gates Pagoda
Dragon-and-Tiger Pagoda
Thousand-Buddha Cliff
Nine Pinnacle Pagoda (also "Nine Roof Pagoda")
Jingsi Road Christian Church

Monuments

Jinan Campaign Memorial
Liberation Pavilion
Jinan Massacre Monument
May 3rd Massacre Memorial Garden (in the Baotu Spring Park, close to Jinan Massacre Monument)
Tomb of Bian Que
Tomb of Min Ziqian
Tomb of Zhang Yanghao
Heroes Pavilion

Historical Buildings

Former Shandong Nationalist Government Foreign Affairs Office (site of the murder of Cai Gongshi, Jingsi Road Number 370)
Chaoran Tower (reconstruction of a historical tower near Daming Lake). 
Dao Yuan, (built 1934-1942, formerly a compound of the Red Swastika Society)
Great Wall of Qi
Jin Family Home (Kuanhousuo Street Number 55,)
Jinan Campaign Kuomintang Garrison Temporary Headquarters (in Daming Lake Park, north of the lake)
Jinan German-Chinese Bank Building
Jinan Former Japanese Military Police Headquarters
Jinan Jiao-Ji Railway Station
Jinan Nanjiao Hotel (address: No. 2 Maanshan Road, Jinan)
Republican Building
Rui Fu Xiang Silk Clothing Store (Jinger Road Number 215)
Shandong Province Minsheng Bank Building
Shen Family Home (Kuanhousuo Street Number 47,)
Wei Family Home (Kuanhousuo Street Numbers 16 and 18,)
Zhejiang Fujian Meeting Hall
Zhu Home Valley (Zhangqiu City,)

Transportation

Huangtai railway station
Jinan Yaoqiang International Airport
Jinan Railway Station
Luokou Yellow River Railway Bridge
Jinan Yellow River Bridge

Universities and colleges

Shandong University
University of Jinan
Shandong Normal University
Shandong Jianzhu University
Shandong Jiaotong University
Shandong University of Finance and Economics
Shandong University of Chinese Traditional Medicine
Shandong University of Arts
Shandong College of Arts and Design
Shandong Physical Education Institute
Jinan Railway Polytechnic

Cultural Venues
Shandong Dance Theater (address: Culture Road West number 123;)
Shandong Province Peking Opera Theater (address: Lishan Road number 36-2;)
Shandong Theater (address: Culture Road West number 117;)
Ming Hu Ju (address: Daminghu Road number 29, Lixia, Jinan 250011)

Sports Venues
Jinan China National Games Sports Center
Shandong Provincial Stadium

Public Roads and Squares

Hongjialou Square
Qushuiting Street
Shengfuqian Street
Spring City Road
Spring City Square
Water Lily Street

Eight Sceneries of Jinan
Historically, eight sceneries in Jinan have been renowned for their beauty; they are known as the "Eight Sceneries of Jinan". The eight sceneries are defined not only by location, but also other factors such as season and weather:

Early spring at Jingping Cliff
Baotu Spring gushing into the air
Appreciating chrysanthemums at Buddha Hill (Fohui Hill, not the nearby Thousand Buddha Mountain)
Mist at Que and Hua Hills
Sunset at Huibo Building (at Daming Lake, also )
Boating on Daming Lake
Snow reflections at the White Clouds Building  (next to the Pearl Spring)
Autumn wind at Lixia Pavilion (on an island in Daming Lake)

See also
Major historical and cultural sites protected by Shandong Province

References

External links
List of Places in Lixia District
photos of sites in Jinan on panoramio.com
description of the 9 solitary hills (in Chinese)
blog about old buildings in Jinan (in Chinese)
list of scenic spots in Jinan by the Jinan Tourism Administration
list of the "new seventy-two famous springs" by the Jinan Tourism Administration
"Seventy-two famous springs" - articles with pictures on all springs

Geography of Shandong
Jinan